Sphaerolobium scabriusculum is a species of flowering plant in the family Fabaceae and is endemic to the south-west of Western Australia. Its flowers are pendulous, and usually arranged singly in leaf axils with a short, scale-like bract at the base. Flowering occurs from September to November.

Sphaerolobium scabriusculum was first formally described in 1848 by Carl Meissner in Lehmann's Plantae Preissianae from specimens collected in the Swan River Colony by James Drummond. The specific epithet (scabriusculum) means "minutely scabrous".

This species grows on hillslopes and sandplains in the Esperance Plains, Jarrah Forest, Swan Coastal Plain and Warren bioregions of south-western Western Australia and is listed as "not threatened" by the Government of Western Australia Department of Biodiversity, Conservation and Attractions.

References 

Taxa named by Carl Meissner
Plants described in 1848
scabriusculum
Fabales of Australia
Eudicots of Western Australia